Leonard William King, FSA (8 December 1869 – 20 August 1919) was an English archaeologist and Assyriologist educated at Rugby School and King's College, Cambridge. He collected stone inscriptions widely in the Near East, taught Assyrian and Babylonian archaeology at King's College for a number of years, and published a large number of works on these subjects. He is also known for his translations of ancient works such as the Code of Hammurabi. He became Assistant Keeper of Egyptian and Assyrian Antiquities at the British Museum.

Works
 
 Letters and Inscriptions of Hammurabi, 3 vols. (1898–1900)
 Encyclopaedia Biblica (contributor) (1903)
 Babylonian Religion and Mythology. (1903)
 Egypt and Western Asia in the light of Recent Discoveries (1907)
 Chronicles Concerning Early Babylonian Kings (1907) - vol1 - vol2
 Legends of Babylon and Egypt in Relation to Hebrew Tradition (Schweich Lecture for 1916)
 The seven tablets of creation : or The Babylonian and Assyrian legends concerning the creation of the world and of mankind. (1902)

Notes

References
 
 CDLI Wiki

External links 
 
 
 

1869 births
Fellows of King's College, Cambridge
English translators
English non-fiction writers
English Assyriologists
Archaeologists of the Near East
1919 deaths
English male non-fiction writers
19th-century British translators
19th-century English male writers

Assyriologists